The 3rd IBU Junior Open European Championships was held from 31 January to 4 February 2018 in Pokljuka, Slovenia.

There are a total of 8 competitions: Single Mixed Relay, Relay Mixed, Sprint Women, Sprint Men, Pursuit Women, Pursuit Men, Individual Women and Individual Men.

Schedule
All times are local (UTC+1).

Medal summary

Medal table

Men

Women

Mixed

References

External links
Official website
IBU
Results

IBU Junior Open European Championships
IBU Junior Open European Championships
IBU Junior Open European Championships
IBU Junior Open European Championships
International sports competitions hosted by Slovenia
Biathlon competitions in Slovenia
IBU Junior Open European Championships
IBU Junior Open European Championships